The Name Above the Title is an album by the folk-rock singer John Wesley Harding, released in 1991. It was his third successive Frank Capra-inspired album title, coming from the director's autobiography.

Critical reception
Trouser Press wrote that while Harding "brings plenty of talent and originality (especially the lyrics, which are strictly his own style) to this enjoyable and intelligent party, the frequent resemblance to Costello gives what is in fact a fine album a waxy air of familiarity." The Rolling Stone Album Guide considered the album to be marred by "excessive cleverness." Peter Kane in Q Magazine describer the album as "light-weight Costello. There's still some way to go, but the signs are good."

Track listing
All tracks composed by John Wesley Harding; except where indicated
 "Movie Theme" Performed by The Morgans Creek String Ensemble - 0:33
 "The World (And All Its Problems)" - 3:24
 "Fifty Fifty Split" - 5:22
 "The People's Drug" - 3:56
 "The Movie of Your Life" - 6:04
 "I Can Tell (When You're Telling Lies)" - 3:27
 "Bridegroom Blues" - 4:23
 "Save a Little Room for Me" - 4:06
 "Anonymous 1916" (Anonymous) - 0:58
 "The Person You Are" - 3:40
 "Long Dead Gone" - 4:26
 "The Facts of Life" (Andy Paley, Harding) - 3:15
 "Driving in the Rain" - 6:06
 "Backing Out" - 3:07
 "Crystal Blue Persuasion" (Tommy James, Mike Vale, Eddie Gray) - 5:42

Notes 

John Wesley Harding (singer) albums
1991 albums
Sire Records albums
Albums produced by Andy Paley